Emile Hardy (18 May 1897 – 7 October 1967) was a Belgian racing cyclist. He rode in the 1924 Tour de France.

References

1897 births
1967 deaths
Belgian male cyclists
Place of birth missing